Penicillium arenicola is an anamorph fungus species of the genus of Penicillium which was isolated from pine forest soil in Russia.

See also
List of Penicillium species

References

arenicola
Fungi described in 1950